Reginald Manning "Reg" Dixon was a sailor from Canada, who represented his country in the 1932 Summer Olympics in the Snowbird in Los Angeles, United States as well as in the 1936 Summer Olympics in the O-Jolle in Kiel, Germany.

Sources
 

1900 births
1982 deaths
Canadian male sailors (sport)
Sailors at the 1932 Summer Olympics – Snowbird
Sailors at the 1936 Summer Olympics – O-Jolle
Olympic sailors of Canada